Democrates was a Pythagorean philosopher about whom little is known. It is said that he was the founder of the basic concepts of the modern era of democracy. Apollonius of Tyana wrote at least one letter to a Democrates, Epistle 88.

A collection of moral maxims, called the Golden Sentences (Gnomai chrysai) has come down to us under his name. However, many scholars argue that these maxims all originate from an original collection of sayings of Democritus, though others believe that there was a different little-known Democrates whose name became confused with the much better-known Democritus. Thirty of the Golden Sayings are also found in Stobaeus attributed to Democritus.

The maxims are written in the Ionic dialect, from which some scholars have inferred that they were written at a very early period. Others think it more probable that they are the production of the age of Julius Caesar. But nothing can be said with certainty, for want of both external and internal evidence. Some of these sentences are quoted by Stobaeus, and are found in some manuscripts under the name of Democritus.

References

External links
The Golden Sentences of Democrates

Pythagoreans
Ionic Greek writers